Nicolas Hugues Mirza (18 November 1984) is a French former professional footballer who played as a midfielder.

Career
Mirza played a number of games in the European Youth Cup for Paris Saint-Germain.

He went on to sign a two-year contract for Yeovil Town from Paris Saint-Germain following his release on a free transfer on 22 July 2004. Yeovil manager, Gary Johnson commented on the new signing saying; "Nicolas is a good athlete and a good footballer and he's got that French bit of class about him". He made his debut for Yeovil Town against Bury in the 3–1 away defeat in the League Two match, replacing Lee Johnson as a substitute in the 80th minute. Mirza made two more appearances for Yeovil in League Two and one in the Football League Trophy. In October, he signed on loan for Conference National club Forest Green Rovers. He was sent out on loan to Conference South side Weymouth in January 2005, where Yeovil manager Gary Johnson's brother, Steve was manager. 
Steve Johnson cancelled Mirza and Kezie Ibe's loan spell early in March stating; "They still had two weeks of their current loan spells left but I have sent them back because, although they are both good players, they weren't doing enough for me". On his return to Yeovil, he was transfer listed.

Mirza moved Pacy Vallée-d'Eure, before joining Paris FC in 2009.

References

External links

1984 births
Living people
Sportspeople from Épinay-sur-Seine
Association football midfielders
French footballers
Martiniquais footballers
Martinique international footballers
Red Star F.C. players
Paris Saint-Germain F.C. players
Yeovil Town F.C. players
Forest Green Rovers F.C. players
Weymouth F.C. players
Pacy Ménilles RC players
Paris FC players
US Quevilly-Rouen Métropole players
UJA Maccabi Paris Métropole players
English Football League players
Championnat National players
Championnat National 3 players
Footballers from Seine-Saint-Denis